C6, C06, C VI or C-6 may refer to:

Vehicles

Road
 Chevrolet Corvette C6, a 2005 sports car
 Cierva C.6, a 1924 Spanish autogyro
 Citroën C6, a 2005 executive car
 Sauber SHS C6, a 1982 Group C prototype racing car

Air
 AEG C.VI, a German World War I reconnaissance aircraft
 DFW C.VI, a 1916 German reconnaissance aircraft
 LVG C.VI, a 1917 German twin-seat reconnaissance aircraft 
 C-6 Ute, a military version of the Beechcraft King Air airplane

Rail
 Bavarian C VI, an 1899 German steam locomotive model
 LNER Class C6, a class of British 3-cylinder compound locomotives

Water
 C-6, United States Army designation of the Sikorsky S-38 amphibious flying boat
 HMS C6, a 1906 British Royal Navy submarine 
 USS Olympia (C-6), a 1892 United States Navy protected cruiser

Anatomy and medicine
 Complement component 6 (C6 protein) in the complement cascade system of immune proteins (native immunity) 
 Cervical vertebra 6, one of the cervical vertebrae of the vertebral column
 Cervical spinal nerve 6 (C6), a spinal nerve of the cervical segment

Other uses
 C6 (explosive), a form of plastic explosive
 C-6 Canal, a canal that flows from Lake Okeechobee in Florida to its terminus at the Miami River
 C6 connector, an electrical power connector
 Circumferential Road 6 or C-6, an arterial road of Manila, Philippines
 Benzotriyne, a hypothetical chemical compound with molecular formula C6
 CanJet (IATA code C6), former air carrier
 Soprano C, a musical note designated C6
 C6 GPMG, Canadian designation of the FN MAG machine gun
 C6 tuning, a common tuning of a steel guitar (the musical chord of C6)

See also
CSIX (disambiguation)
CVI (disambiguation) 
 Nokia C6 (disambiguation), a series of Nokia smartphones
 
 Oral cancer, ICD-10 codes C00-C08
 Paper size § C series